Ceraegidion is a genus of longhorn beetles of the subfamily Lamiinae, containing the following species:

 Ceraegidion dorrigoensis McKeown, 1937
 Ceraegidion horrens Boisduval, 1835

References

Parmenini